Anao or ANAO may refer to:

Anao, Tarlac is a municipality in the Philippines
Australian National Audit Office (ANAO), the national auditor for the Parliament and Government of Australia